Kannaadi Pookkal is a 2016 Singaporean Tamil-language soap opera starring Nithiyia Rao, Varman Chandra Mohan and Shafinah Banu. It aired on MediaCorp Vasantham. from 29 August 2016 to 27 October 2016 on Monday and Thursday at 10:30 SST for 33 episodes.

Plot
Kannaadi Pookkal is a story which revolves around Pavithra (Nithya Mylwahanam Rao). She does not want to get married, because she wants to take care of her father Sundaram who is mildly autistic and she fears that if she has children they could also be born autistic. Pavithra meets Saravanan (Varman Chandra), who convinces her that nothing will go wrong and she marries him. Does Pavithra lead a happy life and bear healthy children? Is she able to care for Sundaram even after her marriage?

Cast 
 Nithya Mylwahanam Rao as Pavithra aka Pavi
 Varman Chandra Mohan as Saravanan
 Shafinah Banu as Meena 
 Vishnu Anand as Arivazhagan
 Kokila as Saravanan's mother
 Khomala Lea as Saravanan's sister
 Ahmad Ali Khan as Pavithra's father
 Dhivyah Raveen as Nisha (Pavi's friend)
 Grijisha as Dharshika

Broadcast
Series was released on 27 June 2016 on Mediacorp Vasantham. It aired in [Singapore] on Mediacorp Vasantham, Its full length episodes and released its episodes on their app Toggle, a live TV feature was introduced on Toggle with English Subtitle.

References

External links 
 Vasantham Official Website

Tamil-language romance television series
Singapore Tamil dramas
2016 Tamil-language television series debuts
Vasantham TV original programming
Tamil-language television shows in Singapore
2016 Tamil-language television series endings